Higher Than Hope is a compilation album by Australian singer-songwriter, Daryl Braithwaite released in United States of America and Europe in April 1991. The album includes the track "Higher Than Hope", which reached number 47 on the Billboard Hot 100.

Track listing
 "Higher Than Hope" (Simon Hussey, Daryl Braithwaite) - 4:26
 "Nothing to Lose" (Mike Caen, Steve Bull) - 4:09
 "As the Days Go By" (Ian Thomas) – 4:04
 "Waters Rising" (Simon Hussey) - 4:25
 "All I Do" (Ian Thomas) – 4:06
 "One Summer" (Daryl Braithwaite) – 3:43
 "Don't Hold Back Your Love" (David Tyson, Richard Page, Gerald  O'Brien) - 5:09
 "The Horses" (Rickie Lee Jones, Walter Becker) - 4:15
 "I Can See Higher Than Before" (Daryl Braithwaite) - 3:49
 "Goodbye Blue Sky" (Simon Hussey, James Reyne) - 3:53

 Note: tracks 1,2,4, 7-10 are taken from the album Rise.
 Note: tracks 3,5,6 are taken from the album Edge.

Release history

References

Daryl Braithwaite albums
1991 albums
Epic Records albums